Notolaelaps is a genus of mites in the family Laelapidae.

Species
 Notolaelaps novaguinea Womersley, 1957

References

Laelapidae